The Llanerch Country Club is a private club in Haverford Township, Delaware County, Pennsylvania, USA (postal address Havertown, Pennsylvania).

The Llanerch Country Club has been operating under its present name since 1919 and under other names since 1901. It has hosted numerous championships, including the first PGA Championship to be conducted in its modern stroke play format, won by Dow Finsterwald in 1958. World Golf Hall of Fame member Denny Shute was the head pro there from 1933 until 1936 when he resigned to become a full-time touring pro.

Scorecard

Notes 

Haverford Township, Pennsylvania
Golf clubs and courses in Pennsylvania
Buildings and structures in Delaware County, Pennsylvania
Sports venues completed in 1901
1901 establishments in Pennsylvania